Tim Gullikson and Tom Gullikson were the defending champions, but lost in the quarterfinals this year.

Mark Edmondson and Sherwood Stewart won the title, defeating Steve Denton and John Fitzgerald 6–1, 6–4 in the final.

Seeds

  Tim Gullikson /  Tom Gullikson (quarterfinals)
  Mark Edmondson /  Sherwood Stewart (champions)
  Fritz Buehning /  Ferdi Taygan (quarterfinals)
  Francisco González /  Van Winitsky (first round)

Draw

Draw

External links
Draw

Tokyo Indoor
1983 Grand Prix (tennis)